The Square Four is a motorcycle produced by Ariel between 1931 and 1959, designed by Edward Turner, who devised the Square Four engine in 1928. At this time he was looking for work, showing drawings of his engine design to motorcycle manufacturers. The early engine with "two transverse crankshafts" was essentially a pair of 'across frame' OHC parallel twins joined by their geared central flywheels, with a four-cylinder block (or Monobloc) and single head. The idea for the engine was rejected by BSA, but adopted by Ariel. Thus it became the Ariel Square Four.

In 1966 Phil Vincent wrote in Motor Cycle: "Alas, in 1959 the Square Four went out of production, a victim of the modern trend towards small, high-revving modern power units. The demand had tailed off a bit, and with reduced output, the price would have had to be hoisted excessively high. At the time it was approaching £350—out of reach of all but a few of the potential buyers."

A further development was the Healey 1000/4 based on an updated Square Four, produced between 1971 and 1977.

4F (1931–1936)

The first Ariel Square Four 4F was shown at the Olympia Motorcycle Show in 1930, in chain driven overhead-camshaft 500 cc form. Early Square Fours used a hand-change, four-speed Burman gearbox.

In 1932, the cylinder bores were enlarged by 5 mm to give a capacity of 601 cc, specifically to accommodate owners who wanted a sidecar. (In 1923 a Mr George Pettyt, of Maudes Motor Mart, had donated a "challenge trophy" for the ACU to award each year for the most meritorious, observed endurance test for motorcycles, known as the Maudes Trophy).

4G (1936–1949)

The "Cammy" engine gained a reputation for overheating the rear cylinder heads, so in 1936 the engine was completely redesigned, emerging as the 1937 OHV 995 cc model 4G. In 1939 Ariel's patented Anstey-link plunger rear suspension became an option.

In 1946, the plunger rear was available again, and oil damped telescopic front forks replaced the previous girder type.

Mark I (1949–1953)

In 1949, the Ariel Square Four Mark I saw the cast-iron cylinder head and barrel replaced by the alloy head and barrel. The 1949 machine weighed around  dry, produced  at 5,500 rpm. The Mark I was capable of 90 mph-plus.

Mark II (1953–1959)

In 1953, the 'four pipe' 997 cc Ariel Square Four Mk II was released, with separate barrels, a re-designed cylinder head with four separate exhaust pipes from two cast-aluminium manifolds and a rocker-box combined with the inlet manifold. A redesigned frame provided clearance for the high-mounted, tall, car-type, SU carburettor. It weighed and cost £336.16.6.

In 1954, Ariel built prototypes of a Mk3 with Earles forks, but the model was never put into production.

In 1959, Square Four production, along with that of all other Ariel four-stroke models, ceased.

Production

Pre-war model designations 
1931–1932: 498 cc 4F/31 Square Four.
1932: 498 cc 4F Square Four.
1932–1936: 601 cc 4F/600 Square Four.
1937–1948: 995 cc 4G Square Four.
1939: 599 cc 4F/600 Square Four.

See also
Healey 1000/4. An updated Square Four-based motorcycle made between 1971 and 1977
List of motorcycles of the 1930s

References

Vintage vehicles
Square Four
Motorcycles introduced in the 1930s